Best Remix (ベスト・リミックス) is the first compilation and remix album by Carlos Toshiki & Omega Tribe, released by VAP on December 21, 1989. The album charted at No. 30 on the Oricon charts.

It was the first best-of album since the DJ Special from 1986 Omega Tribe that selected the best hits for the album, with the album being produced by Hiroshi Shinkawa and Koichi Fujita (as with the previous album, Bad Girl). Tamotsu Yoshida, who was the mixing engineer in the last album, remixed the songs for the album and produced a different sound.

Track listing

Charts

References 

1989 remix albums